SS Navajo Victory was a cargo ship built during World War II under the Emergency Shipbuilding program. It was completed by the California Shipbuilding Company on June 30, 1944 and served in the Pacific during World War II. Victory Ship class vessels were designed to replace the Liberty Ship class. Victory Ships were designed to last longer and to serve the US Navy after the war. The Victory Ships were faster, longer, wider, and taller than the Liberty ships, and they had a thinner stack set farther toward the superstructure as well as a long raised forecastle.

Launch
The SS Navajo Victory was christened by Mrs. Tom Price, wife of the general manager of Kaiser Shipyards; the matron of honor was Mrs. Frank Backman. The SS Navajo Victory was the 15th Victory Ship built by the California Shipbuilding Corporation, it was one of 218 Victory Ships named after cities in the United States.

World War II
SS Navajo Victory conducted supply operations in the Pacific Ocean throughout the war under the operation of the Luckenbach Line. On October 18, 1944, it entered Palau with another cargo ship, the SS Sea Pike, escorted by a Marshall Islands-based destroyer, USS Brackett, for protection. On November 29, 1944, the SS Navajo Victory and the SS Sea Pike delivered troops and supplies from Ewa Villages, Hawaii, to Marine Fighter Attack Squadron 323. Navajo Victory also delivered supplies for the liberation of The Philippines, and for the USS Floyd County, an American tank landing ship. On December 29, 1944, it supplied fleet ships at Seeadler Harbor, Manus Island. On January 16, 1945, it unloaded troop rations at New Guinea for the troops stationed there. It prepared for Operation Downfall, the invasion of Japan, from June 26 to August 15, 1945, with exercises at Leyte. The training exercises were halted after the surrender of Japan on August 15.

Postwar
From 1946 to 1949, the SS Navajo Victory served as a relief ship, a fleet supply ship and as part of the National Defense Reserve Fleet  in Astoria, Oregon.

Korean War
SS Navajo Victory served as a United States Merchant Marine vessel during the Korean War. It made nine trips to Korea between November 18, 1950 and December 23, 1952 transporting mail, food, and other supplies, and assisted in the transport of the 140th Tank Battalion. Merchant marine ships transported roughly 75% of all personnel to Korea.

Menestheus rescue
On April 16, 1953, Navajo Victory received a distress call from the cargo ship , a 7,800-ton British freighter. Menestheus had departed Balboa, Canal Zone, on April 5 en route to Long Beach Harbor with a cargo of rice. An explosion in the engine room (which occurred when the Menestheus was about 90 miles northwest of Magdalena Bay and 130 miles west of Baja California) started a fire which forced the crew to abandon ship. The crew of 80, who were in the lifeboats by the time of Navajo Victory'''s arrival, were rescued by the Navajo Victory and taken to San Diego. The Navajo Victory towed the Menestheus for nearly 500 miles but was eventually forced to abandon her.Long Beach Independent from Long Beach, California · Page 8, April 17, 1953Navajo Victory sat idle in Astoria, Oregon until 1966.

Vietnam War
In 1966 the Navajo Victory was reactivated for the Vietnam War. It was operated by the American Mail Line.Vietnam War, A Fight for Honor: The Charles Kerkman Story, By Michael Ireland, page 31

After the war in 1973, it was laid up in Suisun Bay as part of the National Defense Reserve Fleet as part of the Suisun Bay Reserve Fleet. It was scrapped at Kaohsiung, Taiwan, in 1985.

See also
List of Victory ships
 Liberty ship
 Type C1 ship
 Type C2 ship
 Type C3 ship

 References 

Sources
Sawyer, L.A. and W.H. Mitchell. Victory ships and tankers: The history of the ‘Victory’ type cargo ships and of the tankers built in the United States of America during World War II'', Cornell Maritime Press, 1974, 0-87033-182-5.
United States Maritime Commission: 
Victory Cargo Ships 

Victory ships
Ships built in Los Angeles
United States Merchant Marine
1944 ships
World War II merchant ships of the United States